Psilogramma wannanensis is a moth of the family Sphingidae. It is known from eastern China.

References

Psilogramma
Moths described in 1990
Endemic fauna of China